Baima may refer to:

Baima, Sierra Leone town in Kenema District, Eastern Province, Sierra Leone

China
Baima ( unless otherwise noted) may refer to:

Baima people, subgroup of Tibetans
Baima language, language spoken by 10,000 people of Tibetan nationality
Baima County, a county of Golog Prefecture, Qinghai
Baima Subdistrict, a subdistrict of Yijiang District, Wuhu, Anhui

Towns
Baima, Chongqing, in Wulong County, Chongqing
Baima, Beiliu, in Beiliu, Guangxi
Baima, Henan, in Dancheng County, Henan
Baima, Hunan, in Lianyuan, Hunan
Baima, Nanjing, in Nanjing, Jiangsu
Baima, Taizhou, Jiangsu, in Taizhou, Jiangsu
Baima, Leshan, in Leshan, Sichuan
Baima, Miyi County, in Miyi County, Sichuan
Baima, Neijiang, in Neijiang, Sichuan
Baima, Suining, in Suining, Sichuan
Baima, Xuanhan County, in Xuanhan County, Sichuan
Baima, Baxoi County, in Baxoi County, Tibet
Baima, Zhejiang, in Pujiang County, Zhejiang

Townships
 Baima Township, Gansu, in Huachi County, Gansu
 Baima Township, Guangxi (百马乡), in Dahua Yao Autonomous County, Guangxi
 Baima Township, Hebei, in Yi County, Hebei
 Baima Township, Ningxia, in Zhongning County, Ningxia
 Baima Township, Guang'an, in Guang'an, Sichuan
 Baima Tibetan Ethnic Township, in Pingwu County, Sichuan

See also
White Horse Temple, or Baima Temple, the first Buddhist temple in China, located near Luoyang, Henan